The German Society of Montreal (French: Société allemande de Montréal; German: Deutsche Gesellschaft zu Montreal) is a Montreal-based non-profit organization with the mission to promote the German language and culture in Montreal and to promote the health and welfare of Montrealers of all origins. The Society was founded as an association of German-speaking business people and professionals in 1835 and was incorporated by the Act to incorporate the German Society of Montreal, a public act of the Province of Canada in 1865. Today, the Society is an important social and cultural institution in the German and German-speaking community of Montreal.

Current Mission
The German Society's mission has evolved over the years. While the Society was founded to support German immigrants coming to Montreal (and Canada), the Society today supports all Montrealers regardless of origin. Today, the Society also works to support the German culture, heritage and language in Montreal, by working to make connections between different groups in Montreal such as the Alexander von Humboldt Schule Montréal and the Montreal Goethe-Institut. There is also a Facebook page dedicated to Germans being able to connect, with monthly meetings:

The complete mission statement has four elements.

History

1835-1850s: Early years 
 
After a private meeting in March 1835, initiated amongst others by the physician Dr. Daniel Arnoldi, the German Society of Montreal was formally founded on April 21, 1835 at the Hotel Nelson. The original purpose was to be the voice of the German minority in Montreal and to the support of anyone of German origin living and/or arriving in Montréal with "advice, information and assistance [to those] in need" (Gürttler, 1985, p. 3). At the first general meeting, the 81 founding members appointed Louis Gugy (at the time Sheriff of Montreal) as the first president of the Society.

Over the course of its history, the leaders and members of the Society have ranged from tradespersons such as butchers to professionals such as lawyers, politicians, business people, doctors and diplomats.

From early on, the Society was close to similar organizations focused on supporting newcomers, like the English St. George's Society of Montreal, the Scottish St. Andrew's Society of Montreal and the Irish St. Patrick's Society of Montreal, which were all founded around the same time. In the time leading up to the Rebellions of 1837, the Society, along with the other national societies in Montreal identified more closely with the British side. Over time, the German Society took a more neutral stance.

1850s-1880s: Immigration waves 
Montreal was an important port for European immigrants coming to North America. Even though large numbers of Germans (and other Europeans) arrived in Montreal, not many remained in the city for long: most moved on to Canada’s west or the United States. Nevertheless, the German Society played an important role in welcoming German(-speaking) immigrants and helping them get settled in the city. With its goal to support the welfare of the German community in Montreal, the Society also assisted the opening of a German-language church in the 1850s.

On June 26, 1864, the several members of the German Society assisted in the rescue efforts of a major train disaster in Belœil/Saint-Hilaire. A Grand Trunk Railway train with 467 passengers, many recently immigrated Germans, failed to stop at an opened moveable bridge across the Richelieu River. Ninety-nine passengers and crew lost their lives in the accident. Following the tragedy, the Society arranged for the construction of a memorial at the Mont-Royal Cemetery.

The German Society of Montreal was granted the status of a corporation by the Parliament of the Province of Canada in 1865. The Act to incorporate the German Society of Montreal received royal assent on March 18, 1865.

The mass migration to Canada from Europe in the 1860s and 1870s increased the importance of the Society’s charitable mission of helping needy immigrants. Many immigrants arriving in Montreal had no material means to support themselves, as they presumed the Canadian government would support them in getting settled in the country. As this was not the case, the Society played an important role in helping German immigrants with their immediate needs upon arrival in the Port of Montreal. The Society assisted immigrants in getting settled in Montreal, by supporting them with aid, and the finding of employment and housing. Good relationships with different shipping and railway companies allows the Society to negotiate fare discounts for Germans wishing to travel further west. During and after the Franco-Prussian War (which also contributed to the large flow of migrants to North America) the German Society's relief efforts were also directed to Germany to support widows and orphans.

Recognizing the issue, the German Society, along with other organizations pushed the government to implement harsher immigration policies to stop the migration of people without the means to support themselves. In 1868, the Canadian government adopted legislation and an order-in-council to restrict immigration to those with adequate means. The limited enforcement of these new policies, and the corrupt practices of immigration agents in Europe moved the Society to publish information campaigns in German newspapers and through the German Consulate General in Montreal, it also engaged with governments in Germany to take action against the flow of immigrants not able to support themselves to Canada.

Manitoba Project (1872-1874) 

Under the leadership of land surveyor Wilhelm Wagner (President of the German Society from 1867-1870), the German Society was granted one and a half townships in Manitoba with the goal of establishing a German community in that province. The agreement with the federal government was that the Society would find fifty families in the first year and then 100 families in every year after that to settle the township. Efforts of the Society and Wagner to promote immigration to Manitoba included the publishing of information brochures in German and a reduction of transportation fares. Nevertheless, the Society failed to meet its obligations, and the Surveyor General of Canada informed the Society in the fall of 1874 that the government would reclaim the townships, which due to changes in the political climate, the Hudson’s Bay Company became interested in. The Society put to rest the Manitoba Project.

Presidents of the Society

The Presidents of the Society have come from a wide array of professions and trades, including politicians, diplomats, butchers, teachers, lawyers, doctors, and many others.

 1835-1839 Louis Gugy
 1840-1850 Dr. Daniel Arnoldi
 1850-1855 Henry Meyer
 1855-1858 Ernst Idler
 1858-1859 A. Schmidt
 1859-1860 Gottlieb Reinhardt
 1860-1865 Gerhard Lomer
 1865-1866 Heinz Drescher
 1866-1867 Emanuel Häusgen
 1867-1870 Wilhelm Wagner
 1870-1873 Emanuel Häusgen
 1873-1877 Wm. C. Munderloh
 1877-1880 Fred Gericken
 1880-1893 Wm. C. Munderloh
 1893-1894 Eugen von Rappard
 1894-1917 Ed. Scheultze
 1917-1923 Josua Dörken
 1923-1925 Alfred Pollock
 1925-1926 Franz Ramsperger
 1926-1929 H. Walter Dörken
 1929-1931 Jul. Schwartz
 1931-1938 H. Walter Dörken
 1938-1939 Rev. O. C. D. Klahn
 1940-1947 Louis Augustin (Acting President)
 1947-1957 Heinz Kuch
 1957-1963 Dr. J. Brabander
 1963-1966 Fritz Seebohm
 1966-1969 P.D. Consmueller
 1969-1972 Joseph Johl
 1972-1975 Franz von Müller-Hippmann
 1975-1977 Hans Black
 1977-1979 H. H. Behrens
 1979-1980 Dale C. Thomson
 1980-1985 Helmut Blume
 1985-1987 Richard Brabander
 1987-1990 Wolfgang Schmitz
 1990-1992 Dr. Charles H. Cahn
 1992-1996 Barbara Brunner-Zaharescu
 1996-1998 Dr. Paul Helmer
 1998-2009 Peter Lövenich
 2009- Dr. Gisela Steinle

Membership
Membership in the Society is open to all who wish and are willing to support the objectives of the organization. Since 1835, the membership has been fluctuating constantly, as can be seen in the data table below.

References

External links
 German Society of Montreal (Official Website)

Ethnic organizations based in Canada
History of Montreal
Non-profit organizations based in Montreal
1835 establishments in Canada
1835 establishments in Lower Canada
Patriotic societies
German-Canadian culture in Quebec
European-Canadian culture in Montreal
Ethnic fraternal orders in Canada